Pontoosuc is a village in Hancock County, Illinois, United States. The population was 146 at the 2010 census, down from 171 at the 2000 census.

Geography
Pontoosuc is located in northern Hancock County at  (40.629520, -91.209603). It is bordered to the north by the Mississippi River, which forms the state border with Iowa, and to the east by Dallas City. Illinois Route 9 passes through the village, leading east into Dallas City and west  to the Fort Madison Toll Bridge over the Mississippi. Illinois Route 96 passes through Pontoosuc concurrently with IL-9 but leads southwest  to Nauvoo.

Demographics

As of the census of 2000, there were 171 people, 74 households, and 50 families residing in the village. The racial makeup of the village was 98.83% White, and 1.17% from two or more races.

There were 74 households, out of which 29.7% had children under the age of 18 living with them, 58.1% were married couples living together, 8.1% had a female householder with no husband present, and 31.1% were non-families. 24.3% of all households were made up of individuals, and 10.8% had someone living alone who was 65 years of age or older. The average household size was 2.31 and the average family size was 2.67.

In the village, the population was spread out, with 21.6% under the age of 18, 2.9% from 18 to 24, 32.7% from 25 to 44, 24.6% from 45 to 64, and 18.1% who were 65 years of age or older. The median age was 42 years. For every 100 females, there were 92.1 males. For every 100 females age 18 and over, there were 100.0 males.

The median income for a household in the village was $27,813, and the median income for a family was $31,563. Males had a median income of $29,688 versus $21,250 for females. The per capita income for the village was $14,453. About 16.3% of families and 16.8% of the population were below the poverty line, including 20.0% of those under the age of eighteen and 19.4% of those 65 or over.

See also
USS Pontoosuc

References

Villages in Hancock County, Illinois
Illinois populated places on the Mississippi River
Villages in Illinois